is a Japanese professional sumo wrestler. He made his professional debut in March 2002. His highest rank has been maegashira 15. He wrestles for Yamahibiki stable.

Career
He was born in Tatsuno, Hyōgo, where there is a shrine to the legendary founder of sumo, Nomi no Sukune. He is a member of the generation born between April 1986 and April 1987 (Showa 61) known as the  that also includes yokozuna Kisenosato, ōzeki Gōeidō and sekiwake Myōgiryū. He did judo when he first joined school, but from the fourth year of elementary school he switched to sumo, and participated in national sumo competitions at elementary and junior high school. He had aspirations to go to high school, but was persuaded to join Kitanoumi stable, run by the former yokozuna Kitanoumi, upon graduation from junior high.

He made his professional debut in March 2002, alongside future top division wrestlers such as Kisenosato and Katayama, and also his own stablemate . He reached the third highest makushita division in July 2005, but weighing barely more than  he found it hard to make further progress. He had begun wrestling using his own surname of Shimada, but adopted his present shikona in March 2008, formed from combination of his original stable name (Kitanoumi) and an old name for west Hyōgo Prefecture (Harima Province). He finally reached the jūryō division for the first time in January 2012 nearly a decade after his debut. He was the first sekitori from Tatsuno since Banryūyama who had been a stablemate of Kitanoumi and was then a coach at the affiliated Mihogaseki stable. He spent all of 2012 in jūryō but had only two winning records in that time and was demoted back to the makushita division in January 2013. After moving between jūryō and makushita a number of times he re-established himself in jūryō from the September 2014 tournament. In November 2015 after the death of his stablemaster Kitanoumi, who was also the chairman of the Japan Sumo Association, the former maegashira Ganyū took over the running of the stable, which was renamed Yamahibiki stable.

Following a record of nine wins against six losses at the rank of Jūryō 4 in May 2016, Kitaharima made his top makuuchi division debut in the July 2016 tournament, the only wrestler in that tournament who was new to the top division. It had taken him 85 tournaments from his professional debut to reach the top division, which is the ninth slowest in sumo history. His promotion came 14 years after leaving junior high school. He told reporters that having been in sumo since he was 15, he was disappointed that his contemporaries who had instead gone to high school and university before entering the professional ranks had overtaken him. At  he was lightest man in the top division and some  lighter than the average for the division. Kitaharima's stablemaster stressed the importance of his predecessor Kitanoumi to Kitaharima's success, saying that Kitanoumi always called Kitaharima by his given name "Seiya," because "my disciples are the same as my own children."

Kitaharima won his first bout in the top division, defeating Nishikigi. However he finished the tournament with a losing record of six wins against nine losses and was demoted back to jūryō after just one tournament. Restricted by neck pain, he had two poor performances of 5–10 and 4–11 in the following two tournaments and fell back to makushita in January 2017. After his neck problem cleared up he returned to jūryō after a 5–2 record, but lasted only one tournament. After two consecutive winning records in makushita in May and July 2017 he returned to jūryō again in September 2017. However he lost seven of his first eight bouts, and with a 5–10 record at the end of the tournament was once again demoted. He remained in makushita for the next three years before finally getting his eighth promotion to jūryō after the July 2020 tournament at the age of 34. He secured this result by defeating Takagenji on the final day for a 5–2 record at Makushita 3. He had been out of jūryō for 17 tournaments. In the September 2020 tournament Kitaharima could manage only five wins against ten losses, losing his last four bouts. He narrowly failed to return to jūryō in November and was ranked at Makushita 1 East in January 2021. He was forced to sit out the March 2021 tournament after a coach at his stable tested positive for COVID-19, but his ranking was protected. In January 2022 he had his poorest record for over a decade, a 1–6 at makushita 15, which sent him down to makushita 40 for March 2022.

He is known for wanting to practice day or night, which led to his stablemaster warning against him over-training. Kitaharima has said he has no real hobbies and on his makuuchi promotion remarked that he was thinking only about sumo.

Fighting style
Kitaharima is a tsuki/oshi specialist, who prefers pushing and thrusting at his opponents rather than fighting on the mawashi or belt. His most common winning kimarite or technique is oshi dashi or a straightforward push out.

Family

His younger brother Tetsuya Shimada was also a wrestler at the same stable. He reached a highest rank of sandanme 78 and was known as Tatsunoumi. He retired after the September 2022 tournament.

Career record

See also
Glossary of sumo terms
List of active sumo wrestlers

References

External links

1986 births
Living people
Japanese sumo wrestlers
Sumo people from Hyōgo Prefecture